Events from the year 1980 in Taiwan, Republic of China. This year is numbered Minguo 69 according to the official Republic of China calendar.

Incumbents
 President – Chiang Ching-kuo
 Vice President – Hsieh Tung-min
 Premier – Sun Yun-suan
 Vice Premier – Hsu Ching-chung

Events

February
 1 February – The opening of Dong-ao Station, Hanben Station and Wuta Station of Taiwan Railways Administration in Nan'ao Township, Yilan County.

April
 5 April – The opening of Chiang Kai-shek Memorial Hall in Zhongzheng District, Taipei City.

July
 16 July – The establishment of Central Election Commission of the Republic of China.

November
 12 November – The establishment of National Sun Yat-sen University in Gushan District, Kaohsiung City.

December
 6 December – 1980 National Assembly and legislative election.

Births
 23 February – Shih Pei-chun, judo athlete.
 7 March – Amy Hung, professional golfer.
 9 March – Kelly Huang, actress.
 5 May – Kingone Wang, actor, singer and host.
 6 May – Chang Chih-chia, baseball player.
 13 June – Jocelyn Wang, actress.
 9 July – Lee Wei, actor and singer.
 24 July – Kao Hao-chieh, football player.
 27 July – Chang Chien-ming, baseball player.
 14 August – Maggie Chiang, singer and songwriter.
 15 September – Jolin Tsai, singer and dancer.
 29 September – Ady An, singer and actress.
 22 October – Sonia Sui, model and actress.
 10 November – Calvin Chen, singer and actor.

References

 
Years of the 20th century in Taiwan